Flixton F.C. were an English football club based in Flixton, near Urmston in Greater Manchester. They played in the North West Counties Football League Premier Division until 2012 when they resigned from the league. In the late 1990s they spent some time in the Northern Premier League. Previously they had also played in the Manchester League, the Lancashire & Cheshire Amateur League and the South Manchester and Wythenshawe League. They were members of the Manchester Football Association. They most recently played their home games at Valley Road in Flixton.

History
The club was formed in 1960, playing firstly in the South Manchester and Wythenshawe League before moving to the Lancashire & Cheshire Amateur League in 1964.

South Manchester & Wythenshawe League - 1960-1964
Their time in this league is still unclear, and it is probable that they were not known as Flixton during this time. Possibly played under the St Johns name, a local Flixton club in the South Manchester & Wythenshawe League, and this was the club that many of the first Flixton FC players came from.  It appears that the team only played as Flixton from 1964 onwards.

Lancashire & Cheshire Amateur League - 1964-1973
They applied to join the Lancashire & Cheshire Amateur League in 1964 as Flixton Villa but were accepted only on the proviso that they dropped "Villa".

Playing as Flixton for the 1964-65 season in Division Three, their home games were played at Urmston Meadows in Urmston.  They won the division in this their first season.  In those days, the league didn't have a Premier Division, so Division 3 was the correct division number at the time they won it. 

The title was won after finishing level on points with South Manchester, but below them on goal difference.  However the league had a play-off if teams finished on level points where divisional championship, promotion or relegation were concerned. So the Division Three title was won by winning the Championship play-off against South Manchester.  

They finished Division Two runners-up in 1969-70, two points behind Division Two champions - the original Cheadle Heath Nomads.  This gained them promotion to Division One for the 1970-71 season.

Their time in Division One was short-lived as a next-to bottom finish in 1970-71 saw them return to Division Two.  They returned to the top flight after another 2nd place finish, 5 points behind Division Two champions Old Urmstonians.  Flixton's final season in the Lancashire & Cheshire Amateur League saw them finish 5th in Division One.

Manchester League - 1973-1986
Flixton then moved to the Manchester League in 1973, finishing 4th in Division Two (the 3rd level) in their first season in the league.  There was no Division Two the following season, so were moved to Division One and finished 7th in 1974-75, then 3rd the following season and then 4th in 1976-77.

1977-78 season saw Flixton win promotion to the Manchester League Premier Division by winning the Division One title, 5 points clear of 2nd placed Huntley.  In their first Premier Division season, they finished 1978-79 as runners-up to Salford Amateurs. They just avoided relegation the following season 1979-80, finishing 14th of 16 teams, but recovered to finish 5th the following season.

Runners-up spot was achieved again in 1981-82, finishing 5 points behind Abbey Hey. Finishing 3rd, 4th and 7th the next three seasons, they ended their spell in the Manchester League in 1985-86 with another runners-up spot, this time just 2 points behind Maine Road.

North West Counties League - 1986-1996
In 1986 Flixton joined the North West Counties Football League, playing in Division Three in their first season, 1986–87 when they finished as runners-up. The following season Division Three was absorbed into Division Two and the club again finished as runners-up, winning promotion to Division One. In their first season in Division One they finished in seventh place. In 1993–94 they were relegated on goal difference. However, they bounced straight back up when they were Division Two champions the following season. They followed that up with a Championship won in 1995–96, winning Division One, and achieving promotion to the Northern Premier League Division One. They also reached the semi-finals of the FA Vase where they lost to Brigg Town after starting the competition in the second qualifying round.

Northern Premier League - 1996-2000
Flixton finished in 13th in their first season in the Northern Premier League, 1996–97 when they also reached the third qualifying round of the FA Cup. They again reached the third qualifying round of the FA Cup 1998–99. However, in 1999–2000 they finished in 21st place and were relegated back to the North West Counties Football League Division One.

North West Counties League - 2000-2012
Back in the North West Counties League, Flixton struggled in the following season, finishing in 20th place, just avoiding a second successive relegation. After another season of struggle in 2001–02 they were relegated back to Division Two in 2002–03 when the club's main sponsor, the managers and the first team players all left.

In 2003–04 they finished in fifth place in Division Two. The following season though they finished in 18th after having 21 points deducted. They were promoted back to Division One in 2005–06, finishing as runners-up. In 2006–07 they finished in 13th place and also reached the fourth round of the FA Vase. In 2007–08 they finished in 8th place.

The club dissolved in 2012 after poor supporter attendance.

Stadium

Flixton first played at Urmston Meadows in Urmston before moving to Valley Road.

The Valley Road stadium has a capacity of around 2,000. While Flixton played there, it was also used for home matches by Manchester City Ladies.  

Since Flixton folded, various amateur and Sunday League sides have played home games at Valley Road, including AFC Flixton, Unicorn Athletic, Broadheath Central, as well as North West Counties side Northwich Flixton Villa, before they moved to Manchester Regional Arena.

The ground was purchased in January 2022 by Manchester-based property developer Atif Malik.  He has earmarked part of the Valley Road stadium site for around 12 houses. The sale of these houses would pay for the creation of the wedding venue and sports facilities - as well as football, the sports centre would include facilities for cricket and other sports, Malik said.

Attendances

Records
Record attendance: 2,050 v FC United of Manchester – 2006–07

Averages

In their final season before folding, the average league-game attendance at Valley Road for the 2011–12 season was 45

Average crowds - 2003-2012
2011-12 : 45
2010-11 : 58
2009-10 : 34
2008-09 : 38
2007-08 : 59
2006–07 : 102
2005–06 : 159
2004–05 : 34
2003–04 : 49

Honours
North West Counties Football League Division One champions: 1995–96
North West Counties Football League Division Two champions: 1994–95
Manchester League Division One champions: 1977/78
Lancashire & Cheshire Amateur League Division Three champions: 1964–65

FA Cup best performance: third qualifying round – 1996–97, 1998–99
FA Trophy best performance: first round proper – 1998–99, 1999–00
FA Vase best performance: semi-finals – 1995–96

References

External links

Association football clubs established in 1960
Defunct football clubs in England
North West Counties Football League clubs
Football clubs in Trafford
1960 establishments in England
2012 disestablishments in England
Defunct football clubs in Greater Manchester
Association football clubs disestablished in 2012